The Queen Elizabeth Bridge is a road bridge just to the west of the town of Windsor, Berkshire, England.

The bridge carries the A332 Royal Windsor Way across the River Thames, on the reach between Romney Lock and Boveney Lock. The bridge was completed in 1966, and has formed the principal road route between Windsor and Slough since 1970, when structural cracks in the nearby Windsor Bridge forced that bridge's closure to all motorised traffic.

See also

Crossings of the River Thames

References

External links
 The Royal Windsor website. The Town Bridge, Windsor, 1824. Retrieved 16 January 2006.

Bridges in Berkshire
Buildings and structures in Windsor, Berkshire
Bridges completed in 1966
Bridges across the River Thames
Road bridges in England